Magic/Bird is a play by Eric Simonson about basketball stars Magic Johnson of the Los Angeles Lakers and Larry Bird of the Boston Celtics, their rise from college basketball to the NBA and super stardom, and eventually the Olympic Dream Team, their team and personal rivalries and ultimately their long-running friendship. 
The play premiered on Broadway in 2012.

Production
Preview performances of Magic/Bird (stylized sometimes as Magic-Bird and Magic Bird) began on Broadway at the Longacre Theatre on March 21, 2012 with an official opening on April 11, 2012. Kevin Daniels starred as Magic Johnson and Tug Coker as Larry Bird. The production has the support of the National Basketball Association and the participation of Bird and Johnson. The cast features, in multiple roles, Deirdre O'Connell (Georgia Bird/Shelly/Patricia Moore), Peter Scolari (Red Auerbach/Jerry Buss/Pat Riley), Rob Ray Manning, Jr. (Michael Cooper/Henry Alvarado/Frank) and Francois Battiste (Jon Lennox/Ron Baxter/Willy).

Personnel
Producers: Fran Kirmser and Tony Ponturo
Set: David Korins
Lighting: Howell Binkley
Costumes: Paul Tazwell
Sound: Nevin Steinberg
Projections: Wendall K. Harrington

The play closed on May 12, 2012 after 38 performances and 23 previews.

Plot overview
According to the producers: "At the heart of one of the fiercest rivalries in sports, two of the greatest athletes of all-time battled for multiple championships and the future of their sport...Johnson and Bird, went head to head, electrified the nation, reinvigorated the NBA, and turned their rivalry into the greatest and most famous friendships in professional sports.  With classic NBA footage prominently designed throughout, Magic/Bird transports the audience into the heart of their matchup."

See also
Magic & Bird: A Courtship of Rivals

References

External links
Internet Broadway Database
Magic/Bird Official website

2012 plays
Broadway plays
Magic Johnson
Plays by Eric Simonson
Boston Celtics
Los Angeles Lakers